St. John's rapids (Svatojánské proudy) was a stretch of fast flowing water on the Vltava. It was situated at the place of today's Štěchovice Reservoir.

In music
The rapids were part of the inspiration for Smetana's Má vlast, and also the title of an opera by Josef Richard Rozkošný (Svatojánské proudy).

References

Rapids
Vltava